{{Infobox election
| election_name = 2004 United States Senate election in Wisconsin
| country = Wisconsin
| type = presidential
| ongoing = no
| previous_election = 1998 United States Senate election in Wisconsin
| previous_year = 1998
| next_election = 2010 United States Senate election in Wisconsin
| next_year = 2010
| election_date = November 2, 2004
| image_size = x150px
| image1 = Russ Feingold official photo 2.jpg
| nominee1 = Russ Feingold
| party1 = Democratic Party (United States)
| popular_vote1 = 1,632,697
| percentage1 = 55.3%
| image2 = File:Tim Michels.jpg
| nominee2 = Tim Michels
| party2 = Republican Party (United States)
| popular_vote2 = 1,301,183
| percentage2 = 44.1%
| map_image = 2004 United States Senate election in Wisconsin results map by county.svg
| map_size = 315px
| map_caption = County ResultsFeingoldMichels| map2_image = 2004 United States Senate election in Wisconsin by precinct.svg
| map2_size = 315px
| map2_caption = Precinct ResultsFeingoldMichelsTie/No Data| title = U.S. Senator
| before_election = Russ Feingold
| before_party = Democratic Party (United States)
| after_election = Russ Feingold
| after_party = Democratic Party (United States)
}}

The 2004 United States Senate election in Wisconsin''' was held on November 2, 2004. Incumbent Democratic U.S. Senator Russ Feingold won re-election to a third term. , this was the last time the Democrats won the Class 3 Senate seat from Wisconsin.

Candidates

Democratic
 Russ Feingold, incumbent U.S. Senator

Republican
 Russ Darrow
 Robert Gerald Lorge
 Tim Michels, businessman and army veteran
 Robert Welch, State Senator

Minor candidates

Libertarian
 Arif Khan, entrepreneur

Independent
 Eugene Hem, perennial candidate and former educator

General election

Campaign 
Michels insisted he has more real world experience than Feingold, someone he called an "extreme liberal" who was out of touch with Wisconsin voters. Feingold attacked back by saying that any Republican would be a rubber stamp for President Bush. The incumbent had $2.2 million in the bank, while Michels had already spent $1 million in the primary and had only about $150,000 left.

During both the primary and general election campaigns, Michel ran a series of ads attacking Feingold for his status as the sole senator to oppose the 2001 Patriot Act. One of his earliest ads during the primary accused Feingold of putting "his liberal ideology before our safety", while another primary spot featured footage of the September 11 Attacks and a voice-over saying that "our leaders passed new laws to keep us safe. But Russ Feingold voted against those laws." After easily winning the Republican primary against three opponents, Michel released two more anti-Feingold spots focusing on the Patriot Act. One of the ads showed further footage of the September 11 attacks, while another depicted a Middle Eastern spy photographing a Wisconsin nuclear power plant before Michels appears on-screen and announces that Unlike Russ Feingold, I will support renewing the PATRIOT Act, because we need to be able to track and stop terrorists before they strike again." Michels reported that one-fifth of his campaign's advertising budget was devoted to making and airing the spots.

In October, based on a belief that Feingold was vulnerable due in part to his vote on the Patriot Act, the NRSC pledged $600,000 in support of the Michel campaign. However, after the Michel commercials generated negative attention and Feingold continued to lead comfortably in most polls, the party rescinded their financial assistance. On October 1, a poll showed Feingold leading 52% to 39%. In mid October, another poll showed Feingold winning 48% to 43%. A poll at the end of the month showed him leading 51% to 36%.

Predictions

Polling

Results

See also 
 2004 United States Senate elections

References

External links 
Debates
 Wisconsin Senate General Election Debate on C-SPAN, October 1, 2004
 Wisconsin Senate General Election Debate on C-SPAN, October 16, 2004
 Wisconsin Senate General Election Debate on C-SPAN, October 22, 2004

Official campaign websites (archived)
Democrats
 Russ Feingold

Republicans
 Russ Darrow
 Robert Gerald Lorge
 Tim Michels
 Robert Welch

2004 Wisconsin elections
Wisconsin
2004